Grasleben is a Samtgemeinde ("collective municipality") in the district of Helmstedt, in Lower Saxony, Germany. Its seat is in the village Grasleben.

The Samtgemeinde Grasleben consists of the following municipalities:

 Grasleben
 Mariental 
 Querenhorst
 Rennau

Samtgemeinden in Lower Saxony